Eriophorum (cottongrass, cotton-grass or cottonsedge) is a genus of flowering plants in the family Cyperaceae, the sedge family. They are found throughout the arctic, subarctic, and temperate portions of the Northern Hemisphere in acid bog habitats, being particularly abundant in Arctic tundra regions.

They are herbaceous perennial plants with slender, grass-like leaves. The seed heads are covered in a fluffy mass of cotton-like fibers which are carried on the wind to aid dispersal. The cotton grass also maintains a height of 12 inches and around 2 inches in water.  In cold Arctic regions, these masses of translucent fibres also serve as 'down' – increasing the temperature of the reproductive organs during the Arctic summer by trapping solar radiation.

Paper and the wicks of candles have been made of its fiber, and pillows stuffed with the same material. The leaves were formerly used in treating diarrhea, and the spongy pith of the stem for the removal of tapeworm.

Selected species
These species are included:

Eriophorum angustifolium Honck. – widespread across Europe, Asia, North America
Eriophorum × beringianum Raymond – Alaska including Aleutians; Magadan region of Russia (hybrid E. angustifolium × E. chamissonis)
Eriophorum brachyantherum Trautv. & C.A.Mey. – Scandinavia, northern Russia, Mongolia, Korea, Alaska, northern Canada
Eriophorum callitrix Cham. ex C.A.Mey. – Siberia, Russian Far East, Alaska, Canada, Greenland, Montana, Wyoming
Eriophorum chamissonis C.A.Mey. – Siberia, Russian Far East, Korea, Mongolia, Alaska, Canada, Greenland, northern and western United States
Eriophorum crinigerum (A.Gray) Beetle – Oregon, northwestern California
Eriophorum × fellowsii (Fernald) M.S.Novos. – Ontario, Maine, Massachusetts (hybrid E. virginicum × E. viridicarinatum)
Eriophorum gracile Koch – much of Europe; northern and Central Asia; China, Tibet, Mongolia, Alaska, Canada, northern United States
Eriophorum × gracilifolium M.S.Novos. – European Russia (hybrid E. gracile × E. latifolium)
Eriophorum humile Turcz. – Altai, Tuva, Kazakhstan, Mongolia, Amur
Eriophorum latifolium Hoppe – much of Europe; Caucasus, Turkey, Mongolia
Eriophorum × medium Andersson – scattered locations in Finland, Norway, Russia, Alaska, Quebec, Labrador (hybrid E. chamissonis × E. scheuchzeri)
Eriophorum × polystachiovaginatum Beauverd – France (hybrid E. angustifolium × E. vaginatum)
Eriophorum × pylaieanum Raymond – scattered locations in Canada and Alaska (hybrid E. chamissonis × E. vaginatum)
Eriophorum × rousseauianum Raymond – Alaska, Quebec (hybrid E. angustifolium × E. scheuchzeri)
Eriophorum scabriculme (Beetle) Raymond – Vietnam
Eriophorum scheuchzeri Hoppe – much of Europe; northern and Central Asia including Siberia, Xinjiang, Himalayas, Alaska, Greenland, Canada, mountains of western United States
Eriophorum tenellum Nutt. – eastern Canada and northeastern United States from Nunavut and Labrador to New Jersey
Eriophorum tolmatchevii M.S.Novos. – Krasnoyarsk, Yakutiya
Eriophorum transiens Raymond – Guizhou
Eriophorum vaginatum L. – most of genus range
Eriophorum virginicum L. – eastern North America from Labrador to Tennessee, west to Michigan
Eriophorum viridicarinatum (Engelm.) Fernald – Canada including Arctic territories; northern United States

References

 
Cyperaceae genera
Taxa named by Carl Linnaeus